Huey Gully is a high, deeply incised gully between Mount Keohane and Mount Falconer in the north wall of Taylor Valley, Victoria Land, Antarctica. Containing some glacial ice from Commonwealth Glacier, the gully provides meltwater to Huey Creek, which descends south to Lake Fryxell. It was named by the Advisory Committee on Antarctic Names in 1997.

References

Valleys of Victoria Land
McMurdo Dry Valleys